Ilir Dabjani (born 20 January 2001) is an Albanian professional footballer who currently play as a goalkeeper for Albanian club KF Besa Kavajë.

References

2001 births
Living people
People from Kavajë
Albanian footballers
Association football goalkeepers
Kategoria e Parë players
Besa Kavajë players
Albania youth international footballers